Albert Ballin (15 August 1857 – 9 November 1918) was a German shipping magnate. He was the general director of the Hamburg-Amerikanische Packetfahrt-Actien-Gesellschaft (HAPAG) or Hamburg-America Line, which for a time was the world's largest shipping company. Being the inventor of the concept of the cruise ship, he is known as the father of modern cruise ship travel.

The SS Augusta Victoria, named after the German Empress Augusta Victoria of Schleswig-Holstein, was the first modern cruise ship in the world. She set sail on 10 May 1889, from Hamburg to New York City via Southampton. Two years later, she went on the world's first Mediterranean cruise.

In 1901, Ballin built the Emigration Halls on the Hamburg island of Veddel to accommodate the many thousands of people from all over Europe who arrived at the Port of Hamburg every week to emigrate to North and South America on his company's ships. The island is now the BallinStadt Museum. In 1913, HAPAG owned three of the world's biggest ocean liners; however all were later seized as part of World War I reparations.

Facing the loss of his company's ships after the war, Ballin committed suicide in Hamburg during the German November Revolution in 1918, two days before the end of World War I. Later, World War II again led to the company's loss of ocean-going ships and global market positions.

In the post-war years, HAPAG rebuilt its fleet and focused on cargo container transport. In 1970, the container shipping companies HAPAG and North German Lloyd (NGL) merged into Hapag-Lloyd AG to form one of the world's biggest container shipping companies. In 2008, Hapag-Lloyd was acquired by the City of Hamburg and a group of private investors, the Albert Ballin Consortium.

Business 
His father, Samuel Joseph Ballin (1804–1874), was a Danish Jew who had emigrated from Denmark. Samuel was part owner of an emigration agency that arranged passages to the United States, and when he died in 1874, young Albert took over the business. He developed it into an independent shipping line, saving costs by carrying cargo on the return trip from the US. This brought him to the attention of the Hamburg America Line; the line hired him in 1886, and made him general director in 1899.

Although extremely successful in developing the business, as a Jew, and only being the director, but not the owner of a company, he was not accepted by all of Hamburg society. Nevertheless, he was respected and admired by the Kaiser Wilhelm II and was designated as being "hoffähig" (welcomed and acceptable at court) an honor given to few by Wilhelm. Ballin's home in Hamburg, which currently houses the UNESCO Institute for Lifelong Learning, has a suite of rooms that were built specifically for the Kaiser, to be used when he visited Hamburg. Many different ship companies began to include ocean liners among their fleets, to add luxury and comfort to sea travel. Due to bad weather conditions in the winter months the transatlantic ocean liners could not operate at full capacity, and Ballin thought of a scheme to increase the occupancy by offering idle ships to travel agencies in Europe and America in the winter. 

The first modern cruise, which defined the journey not just as transport but as the actual reward, commenced on 22 January 1891, when the SS Augusta Victoria (named after the German empress) set sail to cruise the Mediterranean for six weeks. The competitors initially sniggered at Ballin, who organized and supervised the voyage personally, but the project was a huge success. In order to accommodate the growing demand, another three of the SS Auguste Victoria'''s sister ships operated as cruise liners, and in 1899, the Hamburg-America Line commissioned Blohm & Voss to construct the first purpose-built cruise ship, the Prinzessin Victoria Luise. It was the very first cruise ship, one exclusively tailored for the needs of well-to-do passengers.

Ballin further expanded the fleet in 1900 when he acquired fourteen steamships from A. C. de Freitas & Co. In 1901, Ballin built the Emigration Halls (now the Museum "BallinStadt") on the Hamburg island of Veddel to accommodate the many thousands of people from all over Europe who arrived at the Port of Hamburg every week to emigrate to North and South America on his company's ships.

Ballin frequently traveled on the ships in his fleet and often spoke to passengers traveling with him to find out about the ships in his fleet and what improvements to make to future Hamburg Amerika ships. Ballin would take these improvements in hand and make sure that they would be placed on both his current and future liners.

 World War I 

Ballin acted as mediator between the Great Britain and the German Empire in the tense years prior to the outbreak of World War I.  Terrified that he would lose his ships in the event of naval hostilities, Ballin attempted to broker a deal whereby Britain and Germany would continue to race one another in passenger liners but desist in their attempts to best one another's naval fleets. Working with his close friend the British financier Ernest Cassel, they convince the governments in London and Berlin to negotiate a solution to the naval arms race through the Haldane Mission of 1912. Unfortunately it was a failure. Consequently, the outbreak of war deeply disillusioned him. Many of the Hamburg-America Line's ships were lost or suffered considerable damage during the hostilities.

Completely distraught upon hearing the news of the abdication of his benefactor and protector, Kaiser Wilhelm II, Ballin committed suicide by taking an overdose of sleeping pills two days before the armistice ended World War I. Ballin's fears were soon to be realized; the company's flagships, the triumvirate SS Imperator, SS Vaterland and SS Bismarck, were ceded as war prizes to Great Britain and the United States.

 Honors 
The SS Albert Ballin was named in his honor, as is the Ballindamm, a street in central Hamburg. A postage stamp was issued by the Deutsche Bundespost in 1957 in commemoration of Ballin's 100th birthday.

 References 

 Bibliography 
 Lamar Cecil, Albert Ballin; business and politics in imperial Germany, 1888–1918 (Princeton University Press, 1967)
 Tobias Brinkmann: Why Paul Nathan Attacked Albert Ballin: The Transatlantic Mass Migration and the Privatization of Prussia's Eastern Border Inspection, 1886–1914. In: Central European History. 43, Nr. 01, 2010, S. 47–83. 
 Bernhard Huldermann, Albert Ballin (Berlin: Gerhard Stalling, 1922)
 Johannes Gerhardt: Albert Ballin (English edition)'' (Hamburg University Press, 2010)
 online

External links 
Albert Ballin by Bernhard Huldermann at Gutenberg.org

 Bio at University of Hamburg
 D. Godsey, William: Ballin, Albert, in: 1914-1918-online. International Encyclopedia of the First World War.
  Ballinstadt, Emigration Museum in Hamburg
 

1857 births
1918 suicides
19th-century German inventors
Drug-related suicides in Germany
Ship management
Jews from Hamburg
Burials at the Ohlsdorf Cemetery
Hamburg America Line
1918 deaths